Patrick Bourson is a French politician and a member of the far-right FN led by Jean-Marie Le Pen.

In 2009, the FN selected him to lead the FN list in the Massif Central constituency ahead of the 2009 European elections.

References

Living people
National Rally (France) politicians
Year of birth missing (living people)